Events in the year 2010 in China.

Incumbents 
 Party General Secretary - Hu Jintao
 President – Hu Jintao
 Premier – Wen Jiabao
 Vice President: Xi Jinping
 Vice Premier: Li Keqiang
 Congress Chairman - Wu Bangguo
 Conference Chairman - Jia Qinglin

Governors 
 Governor of Anhui Province – Wang Sanyun 
 Governor of Fujian Province – Huang Xiaojing
 Governor of Gansu Province: Xu Shousheng (until July), Xu Shousheng (starting July)
 Governor of Guangdong Province – Huang Huahua 
 Governor of Guizhou Province – Lin Shusen (until August), Zhao Kezhi (starting August)
 Governor of Hainan Province – Luo Baoming 
 Governor of Hebei Province – Chen Quanguo 
 Governor of Heilongjiang Province – Li Zhanshu (until 27 August), Wang Xiankui (starting 27 August)
 Governor of Henan Province – Guo Gengmao 
 Governor of Hubei Province – Luo Qingquan
 Governor of Hunan Province – Zhou Qiang (until December), Xu Shousheng (starting December)
 Governor of Jiangsu Province – Luo Zhijun (until December), Li Xueyong (starting December)
 Governor of Jiangxi Province – Wu Xinxiong
 Governor of Jilin Province – Wang Rulin 
 Governor of Liaoning Province – Chen Zhenggao 
 Governor of Qinghai Province – Song Xiuyan (until unknown), Luo Huining (starting unknown)
 Governor of Shaanxi Province – Yuan Chunqing (until June), Zhao Zhengyong (starting June)
 Governor of Shandong Province – Jiang Daming
 Governor of Shanxi Province – Wang Jun 
 Governor of Sichuan Province – Jiang Jufeng 
 Governor of Yunnan Province – Qin Guangrong 
 Governor of Zhejiang Province – Lü Zushan

Events

January
 January 1 –
 ASEAN–China Free Trade Area: China and the Association of Southeast Asian Nations (ASEAN) launch the world's largest Free Trade Area in terms of population.
 CCTV expand to online channel CNTV (中国网络电视台) with C-box software.
 January 4 – Yellow River oil spill: A diesel fuel leak in Shaanxi, China reaches the Yellow River, a water source for millions of people.
 January 6 – China becomes the largest exporting country, pushing Germany from first place.
 January 8 – China becomes the number one automobile market in the world.
 January 11 – 2010 Chinese anti-ballistic missile test
 January 12 –
 Google in an unusual move revealed that its servers have been hacked in an attempt to access information about Chinese dissidents, and that Google is no longer willing to censor searches in China and may pull out of the country.
 China's top search engine Baidu is allegedly attacked by Iranian hackers, sparking a retaliatory attack by Chinese hackers on Iranian sites.
 January 15 – 2010 Suzhou workers riot
 January 19 – Chinese senior judge Huang Songyou is sentenced to life in prison over corruption charges.
 January 24 – The Chinese government denies state involvement in the cyber attacks on Google.
 January 25 – 2008 Melamine milk re-enter supply
 January 31 – A Mw 5.2 earthquake in Sichuan province, China, kills one person and injures 11 others, destroying at least 100 homes.

February

 February 1 – Nine people are killed in a bus rampage in Tianjin, northern China.
 February 9 – 11 – Yunnan wildfire
 February 18 –
 Low profile meeting between 14th Dalai Lama and president Barack Obama in White House Map Room amid opposition from China.
 Hebei Zhengding old city gate burns down
 Asia's biggest railway station, the Guangzhou South Railway Station, came into use on the first day of Chinese spring festival transport rush of 2010.
 February 23 –
 Oxfam Hong Kong boycott
 Chinese authorities increases controls on the internet, requiring anyone who wishes to set up a website to produce identification and meet regulators.
 Communist Party of China 52 code of ethics
 February 26 – 
 National Defense Mobilization Law is legislated in the National People's Congress (NPC).
 Wang Meng wins her third gold medal in the 1,000 meters short track at Vancouver 2010 Winter Olympics to become China's first winter Olympian to win three gold medals at one Games and give China all the women's titles.

March

 March 1 – 2010 Luotuoshan coal mine flood
 March 3 – 2010 Guangxi wildfire
 March 5 – 2010 National People's Congress
 March 11 – Hong Kong 's TVB GM Stephen Chan and four others are arrested on charges of corruption. TVB suspends Chan and two TVB staff were suspended from their duties.
 March 13 – Shenyang zoo scandal
 March 14 – 314 Taipei protest
 March 15 – 2010 Dongxing Coal Mining Co fire
 March 19 – Northern China sandstorm
 March 20 – 2010 China drought
 March 23 –
 At 3 am Hong Kong Time (UTC+8), Google started to redirect all search queries from Google.cn to Google.com.hk. (Google Hong Kong), thereby bypassing Chinese regulators and allowing uncensored Simplified Chinese search results.
 Nanping school massacre: A man in Nanping, China, stabs and kills eight children, and wounds another five at an elementary school.
 March 27 – Tao Hui-xi (陶惠西) self-immolation incident in Lianyungang, Jiangsu
 March 28 – 2010 Wangjialing coal mine flood: At least 152 coal miners are trapped after a pit floods in Shanxi, while 109 others escape.

April
 April 1 – First ever organ trafficking trial in the PRC (est.)
 April 4 – 114 miners trapped in a flooded mine for more than a week in Shanxi, China, are rescued.
 April 6 – One of leading smartphone brand, Xiaomi was founded.
 April 10–14 – 2010 IIHF Women's Challenge Cup of Asia
 April 13 –
 Hu Jintao, President of the People's Republic of China, meets with President Barack Obama to discuss Iran's nuclear program.
 Shanghai Oriental Pearl Tower fire
 April 14 – 2010 Yushu earthquake: A magnitude 6.9 earthquake strikes in Qinghai, China, killing at least 2,000 and injuring more than 10,000.
 April 16 – Yan Xiaoling - Fan Yanqiong Case
 April 22 – 
Emeishan City self-immolation incident
 Huang Guangyu, founder of GOME Electrical Appliances and formerly China's richest man, goes on trial for bribery in Beijing.
 April 24 – Ben ren Yu (郁伯仁) PRC diplomat assaulted in Houston
 April 25 – June 13 – 2010 earthquake prediction case
 April 29 - Xu Yuyuan mass stabbing incident: Twenty-eight children and three adults are stabbed at a nursery school in China.
 April 30 - 2010 Shanghai Expo opening ceremony

May
 May 1 – Expo 2010 officially opens.
 May 5 – Landsides killed 15 Chinese workers in the Tengchong County, Yunnan Province.
 May 6 – A powerful tornado hits Chongqing municipality in south-western China, killing at least 25 and injuring more than 160 people in Dianjiang and Liangping counties.
 May 7 – Ren Zhiqiang (任志强) real estate tycoon shoe throwing incident
 May 9 – At least 115 dead as fierce rainstorms begin ravaging Southern China
 May 11 – 9 trapped miners found dead in coal gas leak in northwest China's Gansu Province Tuesday.
 May 12 –
 Hanzhong mass stabbing incident: an attacker killed seven children and two adults and injured 11 other persons with a cleaver at a kindergarten in Hanzhong, Shaanxi.
 The Chengdu-Dujiangyan High-Speed Railway begins operation in Sichuan, China.
 May 13 – 2010 Yuanyang colliery outburst
 May 17 – Six people are attacked with a meat cleaver before the assailant commits suicide at a market in Foshan, China.
 May 23 – 2010 Jiangxi train derailment: A train traveling from Shanghai to Guilin derails in a mountainous area near Fuzhou, Jiangxi, China, and is destroyed, killing at least 19 and injuring 71 others.
 May 24 – HK democrat and Beijing delegate meeting
 May 25 – 2nd round U.S.–China Strategic and Economic Dialogue

June
 June 1 –
 2010 Chinese labour unrest 2010 Foxconn suicides (est. date)
 Yongzhou courthouse shooting
 June 4 – Dandong shooting incident
 June 11 – 2010 Ma'anshan riot
 June 12 – Chinese Buddhist monks and archaeologists revealed what they believe to be a part of the skull of Siddartha Gautama, the founder of Buddhism, in east China's Jiangsu Province.
 June 12 – 20 – 2010 Shanghai International Film Festival
 June 13 – 2010 South China floods
 June 15 – Heavy rain triggers landslides that leave at least 24 people dead in Sichuan province's Kangding county. In one incident, part of a mountain fell on a construction site in Sichuan province, crushing workers who were sleeping in tents.
 June 19 – 2010 South China floods: Flooding in South China kills at least 88 people, and forces nearly 750,000 people to leave their homes.
 June 19 – 25 - 2nd Straits Forum
 June 21 – At least 46 people are killed and dozens more trapped after a mine blast in Henan, central China.
 June 27 – A coal mine explosion kills 5 in China's Ningxia Hui Autonomous Region.
 June 28 –
 Heilongjiang wildfire
 Guizhou landslide
 Fifth Chen-Chiang summit
 June 29 – Economic Cooperation Framework Agreement (ECFA) signed
 June 30 – Xinjiang UFO intercontinental ballistic missile debate

July

 July 1 – 
China's Xinhua launches a global 24-hour English TV news channel.
 The Shanghai–Nanjing High-Speed Railway goes into operation.
 July 3 - Zijin acid waste mining disaster
 July 5 - 2010 Asian Men's Club Volleyball Championship
 July 6 – Giant painting (浩氣長流) revealed, featuring CPC and KMT figures together
 July 7 –
 Taiwan to allow solo-mainland tourists with some flag controversy
 Hangzhou Xiaoshan International Airport shutdown due to UFO
 Wen Qiang, the former director of the Chongqing Municipal Bureau of Justice, is executed following the Chongqing gang trials
 July 11 – 2010 Xinfa aluminum plant protest
 July 13 – 17 people die and a further 44 are missing in Chinese landslides.
 July 14 – Typhoon Conson
 July 17 – 
 China National Petroleum Corporation Xingang Port oil spill
 Twenty-eight coal miners die after a fire in their mine near Hancheng City in China's Shaanxi Province.
 July 18 – A bus falls off a cliff in the Garzê Tibetan Autonomous Prefecture in southwestern China resulting in the death of 23 people.
 July 25 – 2010 Pro-Cantonese rally
 July 27 – South China floods: A bridge collapse in Luanchuan County in Henan Province of China results in at least 37 deaths.
 July 28 – 2010 Nanjing chemical plant explosion – An explosion at a plastics factory in Nanjing, China, kills at least 12 people and injures hundreds.
 July 30 – Changsha IRD Building Bombings
 July 31 – An explosion in a coal mine in Shanxi Province, China leaves 17 people dead while 24 miners are trapped by flooding in a nearby mine.

August
 August 1 – 
 Floods in northeastern China kill more than 100 people and sweep 3,000 chemical-filled barrels into the Songhua River.
 Hebei tractor rampage: A drunk man on a tractor kills 17 people and injures many others in a rampage in northern China.
 August 3 - 2010 Weiyuan riot
 August 6 – China suspends traffic on the Yalu River and evacuates more than 40,000 people from Dandong over fears of flooding amid unprecedented levels of rainfall.
 August 7 – At least 16 miners are killed during a fire at a gold mine in Zhaoyuan, Shandong, in China. 23 others are still trapped inside.
 August 8 – 2010 Gansu mudslide: At least 1,471 people have died and 294 missing following landslides caused by heavy rains in China's northwestern Gansu province.
 August 17 - North Korean MiG-21 fighter jet crashed in Fushun County, Liaoning
 August 19 – 2010 Aksu bombing: Seven people are killed and fourteen injured in a bomb attack in China's Xinjiang province.
 August 21 – PRC North Korea border flood
 August 24 – Henan Airlines Flight 8387 overruns the runway on landing at Lindu Airport, China. 42 of the 96 people on board were killed.

September
 September 1 –
 2010 China floods: Eight people are killed and 40 missing in landslides that hit Wama village in Yunnan province, near Baoshan.
 Typhoon Kompasu
 September 3 – Landslides in the village of Wama near Baoshan in China kill at least 12 people with 36 missing.
 September 7 - 2010 Senkaku boat collision incident part of Diaoyu Islands dispute
 September 10 - Yihuang self-immolation incident
 September 19 - 6 dolphins from Japan arrive at Beijing ocean park
 September 21 - Overseas Chinese World Conference for Promoting Peaceful Reunification of China
 September 26 - "Designed in Hong Kong, made by Cantonese" label discussion

October

 October 1 - The Chang'e 2 lunar probe launches from the Xichang Satellite Launch Center.
 October 6 – 150th anniversary of Burning of Old Summer Palace
 October 7 - Hainan flood
 October 8 - The imprisoned human rights activist Liu Xiaobo was awarded the 2010 Nobel Peace Prize "for his long and non-violent struggle for fundamental human rights in China"
 October 9 - Chinese basketball team withdrew from 2010 Asian university basketball championship due to ROC flag used instead of Chinese Taipei flag.
 October 16 - Li Gang incident
 October 19 - 2010 Tibetan language protest
 October 22 - Terracotta Army archaeology team wins Spain's Prince of Asturias Awards
 October 28 - China's Tianhe-1 becomes the world's fastest supercomputer, replacing Jaguar in this position, performing at peak computing rate of 2.507 petaflops.

November
 November 1 - Sixth National Population Census of the People's Republic of China
 November 6 - Jiangmen star park opening
 November 12 – 2010 Asian Games opening ceremony
 November 12 – 27 – 2010 Asian Games held in Guangzhou
 November 15 - 2010 Shanghai fire
 November 27 - Qingdao Metropolis Convenience Daily newspaper assault on journalists

December
 December 5 - 
2010 Dawu fire
 2010 Zhangjiagang hospital incident
 December 10 -
 HK journalists attacked at activist Zhao Lianhai's apartment
 Liu Xiaobo absent at 2010 Nobel Peace Prize ceremony
 December 18 - 2010 Eocheong boat collision incident

Date unknown
Bashan 125R motorcycle begins production by the Bashan Motorcycle Manufacturing Co.Ltd in Chongqing.
Handheld Culture online bookstore is founded.

Deaths

 February 2 –
 Ng Teng Fong, 82, Chinese-born Singaporean businessman, complications from a cerebral hemorrhage.
 Raymond Wang Chong Lin, 88, Chinese Roman Catholic prelate, Bishop of Zhaoxian, cerebral hemorrhage.
 February 3 – Qian Chunqi, Chinese doctor and translator (born 1921)
 February 4 – Te Wei, 95, Chinese animator, respiratory failure.
 February 14 – Zhang Yalin, 28, Chinese football player, lymphoma.
 March 10 – Leeann Chin, 77, Chinese-born American restaurateur, founder of Leeann Chin restaurants, after long illness.
 March 13 – He Pingping, 21, Chinese dwarf, shortest man who was able to walk, heart complications.
 April 26 – D.C. Lau, 89, Chinese sinologist.
 May 17 – Walasse Ting, 80, Chinese-born American visual artist.
 June 7 – Chai Zemin, 93, Chinese diplomat.
 June 25 – Wu Guanzhong, 90, Chinese painter.
 July 5 – Jia Hongsheng, 43, Chinese actor, suicide by jumping.
 July 15 – Luo Pinchao, 98, Chinese opera singer.
 July 29 – Zheng Ji, 110, Chinese nutritionist and biochemist, world's oldest professor.
 July 30 – Chien Wei-zang, 96, Chinese physicist and applied mathematician.
 October 18 – Peng Chong, 95, Chinese politician, former Vice Chairperson of the Standing Committee of the National People's Congress.
 October 28 – Liang Congjie, 78, Chinese environmentalist (Friends of Nature), lung infection.

References

See also
 2010 in Chinese film
 2010 in Chinese football
 Chinese Football Association Yi League 2010
 Chinese Football Association Jia League 2010
 Chinese Super League 2010

 
Years of the 21st century in China